Stadium Beyond the Stars is a juvenile science fiction novel by Milton Lesser published in 1960 by Holt, Rinehart & Winston with cover illustration by Mel Hunter. The story follows the adventures of Steve Frazer, a champion spacesuit racer on Earth's Olympic team, as the ship taking him and the rest of the team to the center of the galaxy for the Interstellar Olympic Games intercepts a mysterious derelict spaceship. Stadium Beyond the Stars is a part of the Winston Science Fiction set, a series of juvenile novels which have become famous for their influence on young science fiction readers and their exceptional cover illustrations by award winning artists.

Plot introduction
Steve Frazer, a champion spacesuit racer on Earth's Olympic team, is headed to the center of the galaxy with the rest of the Earth team on board the Hellas. When they intercept a mysterious derelict spaceship, Steve volunteers to investigate. Once on board the ship, he discovers evidence of a non-human intelligence that seems to communicate through telepathy. Upon his arrival back to the Hellas Steve tells the others what he found, but no one believes him. Disqualified from competition on false charges, Steve realizes that he has become mixed up in a deadly game of interstellar intrigue.

Reception
Floyd C. Gale rated the book 2.5 stars out of five for children, stating that "Although melodramatic hogwash", it had "enough action and originality".

Publication history
1960, USA, The John C. Winston Company, Pub date 1960, Hardback

See also

Winston Science Fiction

References

External links
Go to the Internet Archive to read the book online.

1960 American novels
American science fiction novels
1960 science fiction novels
Children's science fiction novels
Holt, Rinehart and Winston books